Gabriele Bartoletti (born 19 April 1984 in Rome) is an Italian footballer who plays as a goalkeeper. He appeared in Serie B for Pescara.

References

External links
 
 

1984 births
Living people
Italian footballers
Delfino Pescara 1936 players
Serie B players
Association football goalkeepers